Half Shot at Sunrise is a 1930 American pre-Code comedy film starring the comedy duo Wheeler & Woolsey and Dorothy Lee. Their fourth film together, it was the second starring vehicle for the two, following the success of The Cuckoos, which had been released earlier in 1930.  Directed by Paul Sloane, from a screenplay by Anne Caldwell, James Ashmore Creelman, Ralph Spence, and Fatty Arbuckle, which had been tailored to highlight the comedic talents of Wheeler and Woolsey. In 1958, the film entered the public domain in the United States because the claimants did not renew its copyright registration in the 28th year after publication.

Plot
During World War I, two American Doughboys, Tommy Turner and Gilbert Simpson, are more interested in picking up girls than in military duty.  In Paris, they go AWOL in order to follow their libertine pursuits.  They alternate between impersonating officers in order to impress the ladies, and avoiding being found out by the military police.  During their hijinks, the pair accidentally steal the car of Colonel Marshall (their commanding officer), which is how Tommy meets and falls in love with Annette, who unbeknownst to him is Colonel Marshall's younger daughter.

The Colonel has been tasked with organizing a major offensive at the front.  His older daughter, Eileen, is in love with a young Lieutenant, Jim Reed.  The Colonel intends to send Reed to the front with the orders.  However, to get Tommy and Gilbert back in the Colonel's good graces, Annette and the Colonel's paramour, Olga, who has taken an interest in Gilbert, scheme by stealing the orders from Reed and giving them to the boys, so that they can be the ones to carry them to the front.

After a dramatic scene at the front, the two are apprehended by the MPs, and brought to Colonel Marshall, for justice. He readies the firing squad, but after the two point out that the "secret papers" they were carrying to the commanding General, was actually a love letter from Olga to the very married Colonel.  The Colonel then agrees to allow Tommy to marry his youngest daughter Annette and Gilbert will marry Olga.  The Colonel also gives his consent to the marriage between his oldest daughter, Eileen, and Jim Reed.

Cast
Bert Wheeler as Tommy Turner
Robert Woolsey as Gilbert Simpson
Dorothy Lee as Annette Marshall
Hugh Trevor as Lieutenant Jim Reed
Edna May Oliver as Mrs. Marshall
Eddie De Lange as MP
E. H. Calvert as General Hale
Alan Roscoe as Captain Jones
John Rutherford as MP Sergeant
George MacFarlane as Colonel Marshall
Roberta Robinson as Eileen Marshall
Leni Stengel as Olga

(Cast list as per AFI database)

Reception
The film made a profit of $400,000.

Notes
Roscoe "Fatty" Arbuckle was an uncredited writer on the screenplay.

This would be the first musical director credit for the Academy Award winner, Max Steiner, who would go on to score many other films, including Gone With the Wind, Casablanca, King Kong, and over 300 more films.

A precision dance routine is credited to the Tiller Sunshine Girls. Mary Read is credited with choreography.

The songs, "Nothing But Love" and "Whistling the Blues Away," had words by Anne Caldwell, with music by Harry Tierney.

In 1958, the film entered the public domain in the United States because the claimants did not renew its copyright registration in the 28th year after publication.

References

External links

 
 
 
 Half Shot at Sunrise at YouTube

1930 films
1930 musical comedy films
American musical comedy films
American black-and-white films
Military humor in film
RKO Pictures films
Films with screenplays by Roscoe Arbuckle
Western Front (World War I) films
Articles containing video clips
Films directed by Paul Sloane
1930s English-language films
1930s American films